Veterans Memorial Auditorium may refer to:

 Veterans Memorial Auditorium (Des Moines, Iowa), previous home arena of the Iowa Barnstormers
 Veterans Memorial Auditorium (Columbus, Ohio)
 Veterans Memorial Auditorium (Providence, Rhode Island)

See also
Memorial Auditorium (disambiguation)
War Memorial Auditorium (disambiguation)